The Right Rev James Jones may refer to:

James Jones (bishop) (b. 1948), British retired Church of England bishop
James F. Jones (minister) (1907-1971), American black Pentecostalist pastor, televangelist and faith healer